The Bowel Movement Bandit (also known as the Ohio Pooping Bandit) is the alias of an unidentified man in the Kenmore neighborhood of Akron, Ohio, United States, who repeatedly defecated in the cars of random people from 2012 to 2015. In total, the criminal defecated on 19 parked cars in driveways, as well as children's toys left in the front yards of homes. The criminal only stopped his public defecation spree after a photo of his face was captured by a hidden camera and released to the public.

History 
Starting in May 2012, residents of the Kenmore neighborhood in Akron, Ohio, found feces on or in their cars. If their cars were locked, the perpetrator would defecate on the hood, windshield, gas tank covering, mirrors, windows, or handles of the car. However, if the cars were unlocked, the perpetrator would defecate on the interior of the car. In total, 19 people reported finding fecal matter on their car, but Lt. Rick Edwards of the Akron Police Department believes there are more victims.

On March 10, 2015, the face of the perpetrator was caught on a hidden camera set up by a man. The man was the father of a woman whose car was targeted by the perpetrator seven times. After the man was tired of these incidents, he set up a hidden camera, which took a photo every twelve seconds. The photo was released to the public by the Beacon Journal on March 11, 2015. The perpetrator was estimated to be in his mid-40s when the photo was taken.

Partial list of incidents

Theories 
The identity of the Bowel Movement Bandit is still unknown, but there are two main theories. The first theory is that the perpetrator was a homeless person. The other theory is that the perpetrator was David Ware, a 56-year-old Akron firefighter who murdered his wife and then killed himself on March 11, 2015. Ware heavily resembled the photograph of the perpetrator, and committed the murder-suicide on the same day that the Beacon Journal first published the photo of the Bowel Movement Bandit.

See also 

 The Mad Pooper
 Crime in Ohio

References 

Unidentified American criminals
Criminals from Ohio
21st-century American criminals
American male criminals
Water supply and sanitation in the United States
Defecation
2012 in Ohio
2013 in Ohio
2014 in Ohio
2015 in Ohio
2010s in Ohio